Bhalka Tirtha (Bhalka Pilgrimage), located in the Veraval in Saurashtra on the western coast of Gujarat, India, is the place where Krishna left this holy body as the story goes , it is said he was killed by an arrow shot by a hunter named Jara, an act referred to in the Puranas as Shri Krishna Nijdham Prasthan Leela. Bhalka is part of the Lord Krishna circuit (Mathura, Vrindavan, Barsana, Govardhan, Kurukshetra and Dwarka).

Bhalka is located just 4 km from Somnath Temple, a Jyotirlinga, situated in Veraval, Gujarat, India.

The site also has ancient history as Prabhas Patan was occupied during the Indus Valley Civilisation, 2000–1200 BCE.

Background

According to Mahabharata, the Kurukshetra war resulted in the death of all the hundred sons of Gandhari. On the night before Duryodhana's death, Krishna visited Gandhari to offer his condolences. Gandhari felt that Krishna knowingly did not put an end to the war, and in a fit of rage and sorrow, Gandhari cursed that Krishna, along with everyone else from the Yadu dynasty, would perish after 36 years. Krishna himself knew and wanted this to happen as he felt that the Yadavas had become very haughty and arrogant, so he ended Gandhari's speech by saying "tathastu" (so be it).

After 36 years passed, a fight broke out between the Yadavas, at a festival, who killed each other. His elder brother, Balarama, left his body through Yoga. Krishna retired into the forest and started meditating under a tree. The Mahabharata also narrates the story of a hunter who becomes an instrument for Krishna's departure from the world. The hunter Jara, mistook Krishna's partly visible left foot for that of a deer, and shot an arrow, wounding him mortally. After Jara realised the mistake, while still bleeding, Krishna told Jara, "O Jara, you were Vali in your previous birth, killed by myself as Rama in Treta Yuga. Here you had a chance to even it and since all acts in this world are done as desired by me, you need not worry for this". Then Krishna, with his physical body ascended back to his eternal abode, Goloka and this event marks departure of Krishna from the earth. The news was conveyed to Hastinapur and Dwaraka by eyewitnesses to this event. The place of this incident is believed to be Bhalka, near Somnath temple.

According to Puranic sources, Krishna's disappearance marks the end of Dvapara Yuga  and the start of Kali Yuga, which is dated to 17/18 February 3102 BCE.

Story
As per the writing in Ramayana, Rama, i.e. Krishna in his earlier Rama Avatar (Avatars) is supposed to have given a boon to a Vanar king Vali (Hindu mythology) whom Rama killed stealthily by shooting an arrow, while hiding behind a bush when Vali was engaged in a battle with his younger brother Sugriva, thus fulfilling his promise of protecting Sugriva's life. The above action of the hunter in Krishna avatar (Avatars) is supposed to be in compliance to the boon of Rama i.e. Krishna in his earlier Avatar. It is believed that Krishna left his footprints. It is a common site of pilgrimage for people who visit Somnath.

Location
Bhalka Teerth  is situated almost 4 kilometers away from the Somnath temple. Presently the government has planned to develop this temple also into a major tourist attraction.

Somnath/Veraval City/Bhalka is very well connected via road and rail network. Nearest railway station is Veraval and the nearest airports are Diu & Rajkot. Bus services are available from Ahmedabad, Vadodara, Rajkot, Dwarka etc.

Gallery

See also
 Barsana
 Dwarka
 List of burial places of founders of religious traditions
 Mathura
 Vrindavan

Notes

References

Sources
 

Krishna
Hindu temples in Gujarat
Samadhis
Hindu holy cities
Hindu pilgrimage sites
Hindu pilgrimage sites in India
Vaishnavism
Religious tourism
Religious tourism in India
Krishna temples